The 2015 Women's South American Volleyball Championship was the 31st edition of the Women's South American Volleyball Championship held in Cartagena, Colombia and organised by South America's governing volleyball body, the Confederación Sudamericana de Voleibol (CSV). Brazil won its 19th title with Gabriela Guimarães being elected Most Valuable Player.

Competing nations
The following national teams participated:

Preliminary round

Pool A

|}

|}

Pool B

|}

|}

Final round

5th–8th classification

5th–8th semifinals

|}

7th place match

|}

5th place match

|}

Championship

Semifinals

|}

Bronze medal match

|}

Final

|}

Final standing

Awards

Most Valuable Player
  Gabriela Guimarães
Best Setter
  María Marín
Best Outside Hitters
  Gabriela Guimarães
  Ángela Leyva

Best Middle Blockers
  Juciely Barreto
  Natalia Aizpurúa
Best Opposite
  Carla Castiglione
Best Libero
  Camila Gómez

See also

 South American Men's Volleyball Championship
 Women's U22 South American Volleyball Championship
 Women's Junior South American Volleyball Championship
 Girls' Youth South American Volleyball Championship
 Girls' U16 South American Volleyball Championship
 Volleyball at the Pan American Games
 Women's Pan-American Volleyball Cup

References

External links
Official website

Women's South American Volleyball Championships
South American Volleyball Championship
Voll
Sport in Cartagena, Colombia
International volleyball competitions hosted by Colombia
2015 in South American sport
September 2015 sports events in South America
October 2015 sports events in South America